Cosmic Quantum Ray is a CGI-animated television series. The series premiered in the United States on November 5, 2007 on Animania HD, then in 2009 in Germany on KI.KA, and then later on October 10, 2010 on The Hub (later in 2014 became Discovery Family). It also aired on Science Channel as part of a sneak peek of the latter.

Synopsis
The story centres on teenager Robbie Shipton, who possesses a shoe box leading to the Ninth Dimension, home of Quantum Ray. Robbie joins Team Quantum, a team of heroes responsible for stopping the many antagonists of the show, such as Professor Evil Brainhead and his hamster mother-figure named Mother, from carrying out their plans. He also attends school in the ordinary dimension, and occasionally characters from the two dimensions end up meeting with each other.

Production
Although produced by Germany's KI.KA and France's M6, the show was written in English, the writing supervised by Head Writers/Co-producers and Emmy winners Pamela Hickey and Dennys McCoy. In 2009, the series beat out Nickelodeon, Disney and Cartoon Network to win the Pulcinella Award for Best TV Series. The series was created by cosmologist Dr. Mani Bhaumik. Hickey and McCoy based all their stories on principles and theories from quantum physics, and Dr. Bhaumik provided the math. Cosmic Quantum Ray is a comedy/science-fiction adventure that, at the end of each episode, explains the quantum physics associated with a story and/or physical gags found within the series.

Cast
 Ashleigh Ball - Allison
 Doron Bell - Lucas
 Richard Ian Cox - Chip Monahan
 Matt Hill - Scott
 Tom Kenny - Quantum Ray, Kronecker, Professor Evil Brainhead, Commander Fuzzy, Guy Gamma
 Colin Murdock - Bucketworth
 Pauline Newstone - Contessa De Worm
 Samuel Vincent - Robbie Shipton, Justin
 Cathy Weseluck - Mother Brainhead
 Chiara Zanni - Atee, Geecey

Crew
 Mani Bhaumik - Creator, Executive Producer
 Tatiana Chekhova - Executive Producer
 Mike Young - Executive Producer
 Andrew Young - Director
 Arnaud Bouron - Co-Director (France)
 Karl Willems - Voice Director

Episodes
 Alison Attacks!
 Sliptilicus
 It Was Nothing!
 What's Up With Gravity?
 There's a Universe in Scott's Head!
 Olga's Dish of Doom
 Chip Monahan: Alien Squirrel Master!
 What's a Bucketworth?
 Me, Robot
 Are We There Yet?
 Un-Real Estate
 Mr. Charm's Bad Vibration
 Eat at Olga's
 Alison's New Pet
 Rings of Fire
 Return of the Alien Squirrel Master
 Hall of Fame
 Here Today, Gone Yesterday
 Pirates of the Dark Matter
 Wild, Wild Wormhole
 Let's Play a Game
 Oh Mother, Where Art Thou?
 Tangled Up in Twins
 Cosmic Quantum... Robbie
 The Incredible Shrinking Ray
 Ms. Zooty's

References

External links
 

2007 American television series debuts
2008 American television series endings
2000s American animated television series
2000s American high school television series
2007 German television series debuts
2008 German television series endings
2000s French animated television series
2007 French television series debuts
2008 French television series endings
American children's animated space adventure television series
American children's animated comic science fiction television series
American children's animated science fantasy television series
American computer-animated television series
English-language television shows
French children's animated space adventure television series
French children's animated comic science fiction television series
French children's animated science fantasy television series
French computer-animated television series
French-language television shows
German children's animated space adventure television series
German children's animated comedy television series
German children's animated science fantasy television series
German-language television shows
Teen animated television series
Television series by Method Animation
Television series by Splash Entertainment